Arsenio Corsellas Serra (17 September 1933 – 17 November 2019) was a Spanish actor.

Biography
He dubbed Sean Connery, Burt Lancaster, Nick Nolte, Kirk Douglas, Robert Shaw, Charlton Heston, Donald Sutherland, Richard Burton and Rock Hudson and others.

He hosted Voz de España S. A. He dubbed George Lazenby in On Her Majesty's Secret Service (1969) and Sean Connery in Diamonds Are Forever (1971) and Never Say Never Again (1983). As an actor he appeared in Amor propio (1994) and Lo mejor que le puede pasar a un cruasán? (2003).

He was one of the foremost voice actors in Spain along with Constantino Romero and he worked with Manuel Cano and Rosa Guiñón.

He died on 17 November 2019 in Madrid at the age of 86.

Filmography
 The Aviators (2008) as McBomb
 Lo mejor que le puede pasar a un cruasán (2003) as El padre
 Amor propio (1994) as Presidente
 Despertaferro (1990) as Rocafort
 Els orígens d'un poble. Naixement de Catalunya
 Los últimos golpes de 'El Torete' (1980) as Rémy Julienne
 Destino: Estambul 68 (1967) as Jeff Gordon / Agent Z-55

TV series
 Marcelino, pan y vino'' (2001) as Jesus Christ

References

External links
 

1933 births
2019 deaths
Male film actors from Catalonia
Male television actors from Catalonia
People from Girona
Spanish male voice actors